New Haven Academy is a four-year, ninth through twelfth grade high school in New Haven, CT. New Haven Academy was founded by Gregory Baldwin and Meredith Gavrin in 2003 as an interdistrict magnet school and part of the New Haven Public School district. The school provides a college preparatory education modeled for Collaborative Education (ICE), a New York City school.

Enrollment in the 2017-2018 year is approximately 280.

Educational affiliations and partnerships 
New Haven Academy is a member of the Coalition of Essential Schools (CES).  New Haven Academy has a partnership with Facing History and Ourselves. Ninth and tenth graders take Facing History classes to explore concepts of history, identity, race and discrimination.

Upperclassman may be eligible to take undergraduate courses for college credit through partnerships with Yale University, Quinnipiac University and Gateway Community College. Students participate in internships within community businesses.  A Student Action Project is required for graduation.

References

External links 
 New Haven Academy homepage
 NHA Library

Schools in New Haven, Connecticut
Public high schools in Connecticut
Schools in New Haven County, Connecticut
Magnet schools in Connecticut